The Chico 30 is a sailboat, that was designed by American Gary Mull and first built in 1970.

Production
The boat was built by Keith Eade of New Zealand, who constructed a total of 70 examples of the design, starting in 1970, but is now out of production.

Design
The Chico 30 is a small recreational keelboat, built predominantly of fibreglass, with a plywood deck. It has a masthead sloop rig, a transom hung rudder and a conventional fin keel. It displaces  and carries  of ballast.

See also
List of sailing boat types

References

Keelboats
Sailboat type designs by Gary Mull
1980s sailboat type designs
Sailing yachts
Sailboat types built by Keith Eade